William Vesey-FitzGerald, 2nd Baron FitzGerald and Vesey,  (24 July 1783 – 11 May 1843) was an Anglo-Irish statesman. A Tory, he served in the governments of Lord Wellington and Robert Peel, but is best known for his defeat in the 1828 Clare by-election, hastening Catholic Emancipation across Britain and Ireland.

Background and education
FitzGerald was the elder son of James FitzGerald and Catherine, 1st Baroness FitzGerald and Vesey, daughter of Reverend Henry Vesey. He was educated at Christ Church, Oxford. Through his father he was of both Old English and Gaelic Irish descent.

Political career
FitzGerald first entered parliament in 1808 as the member for Ennis (succeeding his father), a seat he held until October 1812, when he was replaced by his father, and again between January 1813 and 1818. He was implicated in the scandal involving the Duke of York and his mistress Mary Anne Clarke, but after bringing valuable evidence of the case to the courts he was rewarded when he was appointed a Lord of the Irish Treasury and sworn of the Irish Privy Council in 1810. In 1812 he was admitted to the British Privy Council and made a Lord of the Treasury in England, Chancellor of the Irish Exchequer and First Lord of the Irish Treasury. He held the Irish offices until they were merged with the English treasury in 1816. In 1820 FitzGerald was returned to Parliament for Clare, which constituency he represented until 1828. In 1820 he was appointed Ambassador to Sweden. He tried to make the Swedish King, Charles XIV John, repay the large sums of money given to him during the Napoleonic Wars, but this was to no avail and he returned to Britain in 1823.  He served as Paymaster of the Forces under successively Lord Liverpool, George Canning and Lord Goderich between 1826 and 1828.

In 1828 the Duke of Wellington appointed him President of the Board of Trade and Treasurer of the Navy. This required him to contest the Clare constituency once again, but he was defeated. The election was noteworthy in terms of Irish history because it led directly to Catholic Emancipation spearheaded by his successor, Daniel O'Connell as a result of his win. However, FitzGerald managed to get elected for Newport in 1829, and served as President of the Board of Trade and Treasurer of the Navy until February 1830, when he resigned. He briefly represented Lostwithiel in 1830 and then Ennis from 1831 until 1835.

FitzGerald succeeded his mother as second Baron FitzGerald and Vesey in 1832. As this was an Irish peerage it did not entitle him to a seat in the House of Lords. However, in 1835 he was created Baron FitzGerald, of Desmond and of Clan Gibbon in the County of Cork, in the Peerage of the United Kingdom, and was able to take a seat in the House of Lords. He again held office as President of the Board of Control under Sir Robert Peel between 1841 and 1843. Apart from his political career FitzGerald was Lord Lieutenant of County Clare from 1831 to 1843, a trustee of the British Museum, President of the Institute of Irish Architects and a Fellow of the Society of Antiquaries.

Personal life
Lord FitzGerald and Vesey died in May 1843, aged 59. He was unmarried and on his death the barony of 1835 became extinct. He was succeeded in the Irish title by his younger brother, Henry. Lord FitzGerald and Vesey's illegitimate son Sir William Vesey-FitzGerald became a successful Conservative politician.

References

1783 births
1843 deaths
18th-century Irish people
19th-century Irish politicians
Barons FitzGerald and Vesey
FitzGerald, William Vesey-FitzGerald, 1st Baron
Eldest sons of British hereditary barons
Fitzgerald, William Vesey-
Lord-Lieutenants of Clare
Paymasters of the Forces
Ambassadors of the United Kingdom to Sweden
Commissioners of the Treasury for Ireland
Members of the Privy Council of Ireland
Members of the Privy Council of the United Kingdom
Vesey-FitzGerald, William
Vesey-FitzGerald, William
Members of the Parliament of the United Kingdom for constituencies in Cornwall
Vesey-FitzGerald, William
Conservative Party (UK) hereditary peers
Vesey-FitzGerald, William
Vesey-FitzGerald, William
Vesey-FitzGerald, William
Vesey-FitzGerald, William
Vesey-FitzGerald, William
Vesey-FitzGerald, William
UK MPs who inherited peerages
UK MPs who were granted peerages
Presidents of the Royal Asiatic Society
Fellows of the Royal Society
Presidents of the Board of Trade
Peers of the United Kingdom created by William IV
Presidents of the Board of Control